Saint Johns is a census-designated place located along the border between the Union and Clay townships of Auglaize County, Ohio, United States. As of the 2010 census it had a population of 185.

It is located between Indian Lake and Wapakoneta at the intersection of U.S. Route 33 and State Route 65. Served by the Wapakoneta City School District, the zip code for Saint Johns is 45884.

History
Saint Johns was founded in 1835, and named for John Rogers, proprietor. A post office called Saint Johns has been in operation since 1838. In the center of Saint Johns, on the corner of Center Street and Walnut Street, is a memorial recognizing this place to be known as Black Hoof's last home.

References

Census-designated places in Ohio
Census-designated places in Auglaize County, Ohio
1835 establishments in Ohio
Populated places established in 1835